Taq Hoseyn may refer to:
 Taq Hoseyn-e Seyd Hadi